Harald Irmscher (born 12 February 1946 in Oelsnitz) is a former German football player.

Irmscher played for BSG Motor Zwickau (1964–1968), FC Carl Zeiss Jena (1968–1976) and BSG Wismut Gera (1976–1978).

On the national level he played between 1966 and 1974 for East Germany national team and was a participant at the 1974 FIFA World Cup.

In 2007–2011 he worked as a coach for Belarus assisting to head coach Bernd Stange. Now he worked as an assistant coach for Singapore, also with Bernd Stange.

References

External links
 Weltfussball 

1946 births
Living people
People from Erzgebirgskreis
German footballers
East German footballers
1974 FIFA World Cup players
Footballers at the 1972 Summer Olympics
Olympic footballers of East Germany
Olympic bronze medalists for East Germany
German football managers
FC Carl Zeiss Jena players
FSV Zwickau players
East Germany international footballers
Olympic medalists in football
DDR-Oberliga players
Medalists at the 1972 Summer Olympics
Association football midfielders
Footballers from Saxony